Brian Vicente is an American attorney and marijuana rights advocate.  He is a partner and founding member of Vicente Sederberg, LLC and serves as executive director of Sensible Colorado.

Vicente was one of the primary authors of Colorado Amendment 64 and was co-director of the successful ‘Yes on 64’ campaign in 2012, which resulted in Colorado becoming the first state to make the possession, use, and regulated distribution of marijuana legal for adults.  Vicente assisted the government of Uruguay with adopting a fully regulated adult marijuana market and he serves as a formal advisor on marijuana policy to local, state, and national governments.  Having conducted over 1000 marijuana related media interviews, Brian has been called “the industry's de facto spokesman”.

References

American cannabis activists
Living people
Year of birth missing (living people)
Place of birth missing (living people)
American lawyers